Gordon Thomas Hurst (26 August 1920 – 6 July 1996) was an English cricketer. Hurst was a right-handed batsman who bowled right-arm off break. He was born at Kenley, Surrey.

Hurst made his first-class debut for Sussex against Cambridge University at Fenner's in 1947. He made eight further first-class appearances for the county, the last of which came against Gloucestershire in the 1949 County Championship. Hurst's role within the Sussex team was a bowler, with him 28 wickets in his nine first-class matches, at an average of 27.14, with best figures of 6/80. He took two five wicket hauls, with his best figures coming against Warwickshire in 1947. With the bat, he scored 27 runs at a batting average of 3.00, with a high score of 9. A shoulder injury limited his appearances while at Sussex.

He died at Carshalton, Surrey, on 6 July 1996.

References

External links
Gordon Hurst at ESPNcricinfo
Gordon Hurst at CricketArchive

1920 births
1996 deaths
People from Kenley
English cricketers
Sussex cricketers